Osasco Voleibol Clube is a professional women's volleyball club, based in Osasco, São Paulo (state), Brazil.  It includes volleyball teams for females of all ages, children through adult. Since the 2021-22 season the club plays under the name Osasco/São Cristóvão Saúde.

History
The club was founded in 1993, by the BCN bank, as BCN/Guarujá and changed headquarters' city in 1996, thereafter becoming known as BCN/Osasco. The club was renamed to Finasa/Osasco in 2003. The club even announced it would close its adult volleyball department in April 2009, after losing the 2008-2009 Superliga final. But four days later it was announced the return of the adult team, through a group of sponsors in partnership with the Prefecture of Osasco. Now, the Osasco team is sponsored by Nestlé, at first highlighting the Sollys product line. The club participated in the 2009-2010 Superliga, renamed in 2009 to Sollys/Osasco. In that season, the club became champion, beating its greatest rival: the Unilever/Rio de Janeiro, and also taking the South American Club Championship.

For the 2011–12 season of the Brazilian Superliga, the team name changed to Sollys/Nestlé, adopting the colors white, blue and orange  (and while sporting those colors the team won the 2012 FIVB Women's Club World Championship).
In 2013–14 season of the Brazilian Superliga, Nestle chose to change the product associated to the club name. Thus, Sollys was replaced by Molico, and the team then became Molico/Nestlé, adopting the colors white, blue and red.

Home arena
Osasco/São Cristóvão Saúde plays their home games at Ginásio Municipal Professor José Liberatti, located in Osasco. The arena seats 4,500 people.

Current roster
Season 2021-2022 squad - As of January 2022

Titles
 FIVB Club World Championship
  (x1) 2012
  (x2) 2010 , 2014
 Brazilian Superliga
  (x5) 2002–03, 2003–04, 2004–05, 2009–10, 2011–12
  (x12) 1993–94, 1994–95, 1995–96, 2001–02, 2005–06, 2006–07, 2007–08, 2008–09, 2010–11, 2012–13, 2014–15, 2016–17
 South American Club Championship
  (x4) 2009, 2010, 2011, 2012
  (x1) 2014
 Top Volley International
  (x2) 2004, 2014
 Salonpas Cup
  (x4) 2001, 2002, 2005, 2008
  (x3) 2004, 2006, 2007
 Brazilian Cup
  (x3) 2008, 2014, 2018
  (x1) 2007
 Campeonato Paulista (N.B.: 1994 and 1996 won as BCN/Guarujá):
  (x16) 1994, 1996, 2001, 2002, 2003, 2004, 2005, 2006, 2007, 2008, 2012, 2013, 2014, 2015, 2016, 2017, 2020, 2021
  (x4) 1998, 1999, 2009, 2011

References

External links
Sollys/Osasco Official Page 

Volleyball clubs established in 1993
Volleyball clubs in São Paulo (state)
Osasco
Brazilian volleyball clubs
1993 establishments in Brazil